Arkansas Highway 325 (AR 325, Hwy. 325) is a north–south state highway in Mississippi County, Arkansas. The route of  runs from US 61 in Osceola north through the city to terminate at Highway 158.

Route description
AR 325 runs north from US 61 south of Osceola. Highway 325 passes the Hale Avenue Historic District, City Hall, and the Florida Brothers Building all listed on the National Register of Historic Places. The route also passes within a block of the Mississippi County Courthouse.

Another overlap begins westbound with AR 119 for another . AR 325 then runs due north to terminate at AR 158 at the New Salem Cemetery east of Interstate 55 and Victoria.

Major intersections

See also

 List of state highways in Arkansas

References

External links

325
Transportation in Mississippi County, Arkansas
Osceola, Arkansas